Collège des Frères may refer to any of several schools in the Middle East:

 Collège des Frères (Bab al-Louq), a La Sallian school in Cairo, Egypt
 Collège des Frères Maristes Champville, a school in Lebanon
 Collège des Frères, the name of several La Sallian educational institutions in Israel and Palestine